Susumu Matsushita (松下進 Matsushita Susumu; born February 6, 1950, in Fussa, Tokyo) is a Japanese manga artist known for his unique American comic–influenced design.

Early years
Born in early 1950, Susumu Matsushita developed an aptitude for artistic design at a young age. He was influenced by animated Disney films featuring animal designs and by the American comics that were enjoyed by Matsushita's American uncle. He attended a specialized school and was educated in industrial design and later music where he gained a lasting appreciation for The Beatles. During this period, Matsushita attended an exhibition by Alan Aldridge in Ikebukuro's Seibu Department Stores. Fascinated by Aldridge's original illustrations for The Beatles Illustrated Lyrics, the exhibition made a strong impression on Matsushita and he determined to learn how to use the airbrush. Within a few months of experimentation he completely shifted to graphic design and the airbrush became his primary tool.

Career
Matsushita began working as a freelance graphic designer in 1973. He had difficulties marketing himself initially, however his career gained momentum after securing a 1976 deal with Magazine House to produce magazine covers for the fashion magazine, Popeye. This was soon followed by a contract with Shueisha in 1979 to creating artwork for Young Jump. Matsushita's development of Young Jumps mascot, Mac Bear (later Buddy Bear), was to provide a significant moment in his career as he would shift increasingly toward the development of characters and mascots.

Creating his own studio company in 1986, Matsushita immediately signed a contract with ASCII to produce covers for the video game magazine, Famicom Tsūshin (subsequently shortened to Famitsū). With professional connections to the Jump magazine line and to Famitsū, requests were made for the development of numerous mascots for magazine split-offs and for video game character designs. These in turn became business propositions for Matsushita to develop mascots for musical bands, sports leagues, and even commercial and industrial organizations.

Mascots and characters
Matsushita's illustrations have frequently appeared in video game magazines including the creation of numerous covers for publications such as the Jump magazine line and Famitsu (for which Matsushita has designed the mascot). Matsushita also designed  for younger readers and is responsible for creating the mascots of numerous Famitsu spinoff magazines including:
Famitsu Bros. (for which Matsushita designed the mascot)
Satellaview Tsūshin (for which Matsushita designed )
Famitsu PS (for which Matsushita created the )
Game Boy Tsushin (for which Matsushita created the )
He also drew the old Shueisha Business Jump magazine's mascot, which was a mouse.

Matsushita has also designed mascots and characters for video games and collectible card games including:
Adventure Island (1986)
The Derby Stallion series (1991)
 (1993)
Down the World: Mervil's Ambition (1994)
Motor Toon Grand Prix (1994)
Maximo: Ghosts to Glory (2001) and its sequel Maximo vs. Army of Zin (2003)
The Magical Ninja: Jiraiya Kenzan! (2004, cancelled)
 (2012, limited release for Famitsu GREE's Aquarian Age)
"Maximum the Hormone" - A limited 2017 T-Card from Tsutaya (Culture Convenience Club)
Tiny Barbarian (2017, Nicalis)
Death end re;Quest (2018, final boss)

Matsushita's designs, mascots, and characters have also appeared in the Kitakyushu-based theme park Space World (Matsushita designed Lucky Rabbit and friends), Minato's All of Me Club, and as concept art for the Monkey Magic television series.

Exhibitions
Matsushita has exhibited his works on a number of occasions throughout his career. Career highlights include:
 (2003, Sony Building, Ginza, Tokyo)
 (2013, Gallery EpiCute, Chiyoda, Tokyo)
 (2019, Bunkamura in Shibuya, Tokyo's Dōgenzaka district)

Personal life
Matsushita is married to American-Japanese jazz singer Naomi Grace, for whom he acts as her producer. Matsushita also  performs with the band, .

Notes

References

External links
 Susumu Matsushita Enterprise
 Susumu Matsushita's Blog

1950 births
Album-cover and concert-poster artists
Anime character designers
Japanese cartoonists
Japanese entertainers
Japanese guitarists
Japanese poster artists
Japanese video game designers
Living people
Manga artists from Tokyo
Musicians from Western Tokyo
People from Fussa, Tokyo
Video game artists